Supervolcano is a 2005 disaster docudrama television film directed by Tony Mitchell and written by Edward Canfor-Dumas. It is based on the speculated and potential eruption of the volcanic Yellowstone Caldera, located in Yellowstone National Park. The film stars an ensemble cast consisting of Michael Riley, Gary Lewis, Shaun Johnston, Adrian Holmes, Jennifer Copping, Rebecca Jenkins, Tom McBeath, Robert Wisden, Susan Duerden, Jane McLean, Sam Charles, and Kevin McNulty.

Supervolcano premiered on BBC One in the United Kingdom on 13 March 2005, before airing on Discovery Channel in Canada and the United States on 10 April 2005. The film was nominated for a Primetime Emmy Award and a BAFTA Award for its visual effects.

Plot

Richard Lieberman, the scientist in charge of Yellowstone Volcano Observatory, gives a press conference with his colleagues Jock Galvin, Dave, Matt and Nancy, and their boss, Michael Eldridge, to present their new virtual imagery simulator VIRGIL, which Eldridge claims will greatly aid in their research. Reporter Maggie Chin asks about the possibility of an eruption, which Rick dismisses as a remote possibility.

After an earthquake triggers a tsunami on one of the park's lakes, Maggie interviews Kenneth "Ken" Wylie on TV about his new book on volcanoes. Rick is upset by Ken's appearance and it is revealed that the two are brothers-in-law. Rick and Ken later argue, with Rick accusing Ken of creating a mass panic in order to sell his book.

The undersecretary of FEMA, Wendy Reiss, visits and asks Rick about the worst-case scenario if Yellowstone does release a "super eruption". He shows her a simulation, revealing the devastating results of an ashfall across the US should the volcano ever erupt.

After a hydrothermal event at the Norris Geyser Basin and more questions from the press, Rick's team runs a simulation of possible eruptions on VIRGIL. They learn that even a moderate eruption could potentially destabilize the rest of the magma chamber under Yellowstone and trigger a super eruption.

After more seismic events, the park is closed. Maggie comes to Yellowstone anyway, and Rick sends Matt to give her a tour of the park. They discover harmonic tremor near Norris, indicating that an eruption of unknown scale is imminent.

An email about the expected eruption leaks to the press, causing a national panic. FEMA schedules a press conference in Washington, DC, at which Rick is pressured into saying that the eruption will not be large.

While Rick is flying back from the conference, his colleagues in the field office finish plugging in the latest data for the eruption. To their horror, discover that the top of the magma chamber alone has more than enough eruptible magma to destabilize the chamber and trigger a super eruption. As they realize this, the volcano suddenly erupts violently, severely damaging the field office and injuring Jock. Matt investigates the eruption and contacts Dave about it to inform Rick. A pyroclastic flow forces the team to abandon the main USGS office and flee; Jock flees in the helicopter while Nancy and Matt flee in their truck, but the flow outpaces and kills them both.

Rick contacts Dave, another team member who left before the eruption to set up a backup office in a hotel in Bozeman. Meanwhile, the vent is blowing ash east across the US and across major commercial air routes, prompting FEMA to clear American airspace and take other protective measures. Rick's plane flies directly into the ash cloud, damaging the engines, and they make an emergency landing in Cheyenne. Rick and Ken decide to go to the FEMA office in Denver but are caught under the ashfall and decide to look for a nearby military installation instead.

The motel roof collapses due to heavy ashfall after more caldera vents open, destroying the backup office and killing Dave.

Rick and Ken both manage to reach the military installation safely. Weathering the eruption inside the installation, Rick makes contact with FEMA and determines that the vents are going to merge into one massive caldera in an eruption on the scale of the Huckleberry Ridge Eruption, the largest in Yellowstone's history.

Government officials try to come up with a plan to save the 25 million people trapped by the ashfall, but Rick convinces them that they cannot possibly hope to do so; the ash will make it impossible for planes to safely evacuate people or drop supplies. Instead, following his advice, FEMA creates the "Walk to Life" program, telling people to walk through the ash to safety.

One week after the eruption starts, the ground above the magma chamber begins to fall into the empty space left by the ejected magma, signalling the end of the eruption. However, the damage has been done; the lingering atmospheric effects causes a volcanic winter to occur. Much of the US has been rendered uninhabitable, some were liquidated by the eruption without the possibility of restoration. The Walk to Life program saves 7.3 million of the 25 million people trapped by the ash, including Rick and Ken, who survive the eruption and manage to walk out of the ashfall themselves.

Cast

 Michael Riley as Rick Lieberman
 Gary Lewis as Jock Galvin
 Shaun Johnston as Matt
 Adrian Holmes as Dave Price
 Jane McLean as Maggie Chin
 Jennifer Copping as Nancy
 Rebecca Jenkins as Wendy Reiss
 Tom McBeath as Michael Eldridge
 Robert Wisden as Kenneth Wylie
 Susan Duerden as Fiona Lieberman
 Emy Aneke as Johnson

 Garry Chalk as Billy Marshall
 Garwin Sanford as Bob Mann
 Sam Charles as William Lieberman
 Kevin McNulty as Joe Foster
 Shelagh Mitchell as Fiona's Mother
 Jay Hernandez as USAF Airman
 Leslie Reyes as Rachel
 Joanna Gosling as herself
 Chris Lowe as himself
 Anna Jones as herself

Production
Supervolcano, which cost £2.8 million, is one of the most expensive programmes the BBC has ever made. It was funded by the BBC along with television stations in the United States, Germany, France, and Japan.

Reception

Critical response
Brian Lowry of Variety wrote: "As disaster pics that make you want to play hooky from work go, Supervolcano has its unsettling moments." He also stated: "The biggest problem, actually, is that there's no action to be taken in response to this "What if Yellowstone National Park goes kablooey?" threat, except perhaps to get the hell out of North America."

Accolades

References

External links
 
 
 

2005 films
2005 television films
2000s British films
2000s Canadian films
2000s disaster films
2000s English-language films
2000s science fiction drama films
BBC television docudramas
British disaster films
British docudrama films
British drama television films
British science fiction drama films
British science fiction television films
Canadian disaster films
Canadian docudrama films
Canadian drama television films
Canadian science fiction drama films
Canadian science fiction television films
Disaster television films
English-language Canadian films
Films about Yellowstone Caldera
Films directed by Tony Mitchell
Films set in the future
Films set in the Yellowstone National Park
Films shot in London
Films shot in Vancouver
Films shot in Wyoming
Science docudramas
Science fiction disaster films